Les Sept péchés capitaux is a 1962 French film composed of seven different segments, one for each of the seven deadly sins, each being by different directors and featuring different casts. At the time it served as a showcase for rising directors and stars, many of whom achieved later fame.

Segments

Anger 
Directed by Sylvain Dhomme and Max Douy from a script by Eugène Ionesco. Anger seizes a man who finds a fly in his Sunday soup. It spreads through his neighborhood, his city, his country and soon the whole world.

Envy
Directed by Édouard Molinaro. Starring Dany Saval (Rosette) and Claude Brasseur (Riri). Envious of a movie star who is staying at the hotel where she works, the waitress Rosette does everything she can to seduce the actress's lover. Some time later, after having realized her ambition, she returns to the hotel as a client.

Sloth 
Written and directed by Jean-Luc Godard. Eddie Constantine, who plays himself, is approached by a starlet who he takes to his home with well-stated intentions. But the hero's laziness is so relentless that nothing untoward happens.

Lust
Directed by Jacques Demy from a script by himself and Roger Peyrefitte. Jacques (Laurent Terzieff) and Bernard (Jean-Louis Trintignant) search for the definition of lust in a reproduction of The Garden of Earthly Delights by Hieronymus Bosch. Bernard recalls his childhood with his parents (Jean Desailly and Micheline Presle), when he confused lust with luxury. Also features Nicole Berger.

Pride
Directed by Roger Vadim from a script by Félicien Marceau.
A woman (Marina Vlady) leaves her lover (Sami Frey) to return to her husband (Jean-Pierre Aumont) who cheats on her, something that his pride can not admit.

Gluttony
Directed by Philippe de Broca from a script by Daniel Boulanger. Valentin (Georges Wilson) travels to the burial of his father who died of indigestion, but stopping to eat on the way causes him to be late for the meal which follows the funeral.

Greed
Directed and scripted by Claude Chabrol. A group of university students in Paris dream of a night of love with Suzon, whose rates are staggering. To raise the money, they organize a lottery among themselves so that at least the winner will enact their fantasy. Actors include Claude Berri, Jean-Claude Brialy, Jean-Pierre Cassel, Claude Rich, Jacques Charrier and Claude Chabrol himself as a pharmacist (the career his father wanted for him).

References

External links 
 

1962 films
Titanus films
French anthology films
Films scored by Michel Legrand
Films directed by Roger Vadim
Films directed by Philippe de Broca
Films directed by Claude Chabrol
Films directed by Jacques Demy
Films directed by Jean-Luc Godard
Seven deadly sins in popular culture
1960s French films